The Rolandas Kalinauskas RK-5 Ruth, also called the Viltis, is a Lithuanian light aircraft, designed and produced by Rolandas Kalinauskas, of Prienai. The aircraft is supplied as a complete ready-to-fly-aircraft.

Design and development
The RK-5 is derived from the Rolandas Kalinauskas RK-3 Wind. The RK-5 features a strut-braced high wing, a four-seat enclosed cabin accessed via doors, fixed tricycle landing gear and a single engine in tractor configuration.

The aircraft fuselage is made from welded steel tubing supplemented by wooden stringers, while the wing is of wooden structure, all covered in doped aircraft fabric. The wing is supported by a single strut on each side with a single jury strut. The standard engine employed is the  Avia M 332 four-cylinder, inverted, air-cooled, supercharged, inline, four-stroke powerplant.

It is supplied with a wide range of standard equipment, including leather seats and tinted windows.

Specifications (RK-5)

References

External links

2000s Lithuanian ultralight aircraft
Single-engined tractor aircraft